The 2014 New Hampshire Wildcats football team represented the University of New Hampshire in the 2014 NCAA Division I FCS football season. They were led by 16th-year head coach Sean McDonnell and played their home games at Cowell Stadium. They were a member of the Colonial Athletic Association (CAA). They finished the season 12–2, 8–0 in CAA play to win the CAA championship. They earned the CAA's automatic bid to the FCS Playoffs where they defeated Fordham  in the second round and Chattanooga in the quarterfinals before losing to Illinois State in the semifinals.

Schedule

Ranking movements

References

New Hampshire
New Hampshire Wildcats football seasons
Colonial Athletic Association football champion seasons
New Hampshire
New Hampshire Wildcats football